Prior to its uniform adoption of proportional representation in 1999, the United Kingdom used first-past-the-post for the European elections in England, Scotland and Wales. The European Parliament constituencies used under that system were smaller than the later regional constituencies and only had one Member of the European Parliament each.

The constituency of London North West was one of them.

When it was created in England in 1979, it consisted of the Westminster Parliament constituencies of Brent East, Brent North, Brent South, Chipping Barnet, Harrow Central, Harrow East, Harrow West, Hendon North and Hendon South. United Kingdom Parliamentary constituencies were redrawn in 1983 and the European constituencies were altered to reflect this. The new seat comprised the following Westminster constituencies: Brent East, Brent North, Brent South, Harrow East, Harrow West, Hayes and Harlington, Ruislip-Northwood and Uxbridge. These boundaries were used in 1984, 1989 and 1994.

Members of the European Parliament

Election results

References

External links
 David Boothroyd's United Kingdom Election Results

North West
20th century in London
1979 establishments in England
1999 disestablishments in England
Constituencies established in 1979
Constituencies disestablished in 1999